Carlisle High School may refer to:

Carlisle High School (Carisle, Arkansas)
Carlisle High School (Carlisle, Iowa)
Carlisle High School (Carlisle, Ohio)
Carlisle High School (Carlisle, Pennsylvania)
Carlisle High School (Price, Texas)
 Carlisle and County High School for Girls, a former girls grammar school in Carlisle (England), now called Richard Rose Central Academy
Carlisle County High School (Bardwell, Kentucky)
Concord-Carlisle High School (Concord, Massachusetts)